A Torch Against the Night is a fantasy novel written by Pakistani-American author Sabaa Tahir. It was published on August 30, 2016 by Razorbill, an imprint of Penguin Random House. It is the second book in the An Ember in the Ashes series, preceded by An Ember in the Ashes and followed by A Reaper at the Gates. The story follows former slave Laia and former soldier Elias on a mission to save Laia's brother; and Helene, the unfortunate blood shrike. The novel is narrated in the first-person, alternating between the points of view of Laia, Elias and Helene.

Plot
The second book in the Ember Quartet picks up where the first book left off. Laia, a Scholar and Elias, a Martial, are running for their lives from the Empire. They plan to head to Kauf prison, where they will attempt to free Darin, Laia's brother, who has been imprisoned there. Darin has special skills as a blacksmith that make him essential to the survival of his people, the Scholars. 

Meanwhile, the story also follows the character of Helene Aquilla, who was Elias's best friend and has now been charged by the new Emperor--her old enemy Marcus--to hunt Elias down. With help from her friends Faris and Dex--Helene begins the difficult task. Along the way, the Commandant Keris Veturia--now Emperor Marcus's lieutenant--makes things more difficult by assigning a man named Avitas Harper to go along with Helene. 

All along the way, Laia and Elias face the agents of their enemies--Emperor Marcus, the Commandant, and even supernatural creatures who are hunting Laia for reasons she doesn't yet understand. 

Point of view characters in this book include Laia of Serra, Elias Veturius and Helene Aquilla.

Development
Tahir has stated the global refugee crisis, her childhood, news about child soldiers and the novel On Killing inspired A Torch Against the Night.

Reception
Publishers Weekly, in a starred review stated the novel "has a darker tone and even higher stakes than its predecessor, setting the stage for a thrilling conclusion." Kirkus Reviews called the novel "An excellent continuation of a series seemingly designed for readers of the political, bloody fantasy style du jour, set apart by an uncommon world." The A.V. Club, TheGuardian.com and The Christian Science Monitor praised the novel's way of subverting the young adult fiction genre's clichés.

A Torch Against the Night is included in Time magazine's 100 Best Fantasy Books of All Time list.

References

2016 fantasy novels
2016 American novels
American fantasy novels
English-language novels
American young adult novels
Young adult fantasy novels
Razorbill books